Clean Air, Cloud Science is the 2005 debut EP by Chicago band Cains & Abels. This album was released on New Blood and distributed by States Rights Records.

Track listing
"Surprise"
"As A Boy"
"My New Bravado"
""
"An Introduction"

2005 debut EPs
Cains & Abels albums